The Bucharest South Power Station is a large thermal power plant located in Bucharest, having 2 generation groups of 50 MW each, 2 units of 100 MW and 2 units of 125 MW having a total electricity generation capacity of 550 MW.

The two chimneys of the power station are 140 metres tall.

References

External links
Official site 

Natural gas-fired power stations in Romania
Economy of Bucharest